"Sunshine" is a song by American hip hop recording artist Lil' Flip, released May 24, 2004, as the second single from his third album, U Gotta Feel Me (2004). The song, produced by the Synphony, features vocals by American singer Lea. It reached number two on the US Billboard Hot R&B/Hip-Hop Songs, Hot Rap Songs, and Hot 100 charts, stuck in each case behind Terror Squad's "Lean Back". It went on to become his most successful single to date.

The official remix is called "Baby Boy, Baby Girl (Sunshine Remix)" and also featured singer Amerie, but it was later switched to Lea. The remix samples late rapper The Notorious B.I.G.'s 1997 single, "Hypnotize".

Track listings
US 12-inch single
A1. "Baby Boy, Baby Girl" (Sunshine remix featuring Lea—explicit) – 3:41
A2. "Baby Boy, Baby Girl" (Sunshine remix featuring Lea—clean) – 3:40
A3. "Baby Boy, Baby Girl" (Sunshine remix featuring Lea—instrumental) – 3:40
A4. "Sunshine" (featuring Lea—explicit) – 3:45
B1. "The Ghetto" (explicit) – 2:22
B2. "The Ghetto" (clean) – 2:22
B3. "The Ghetto" (instrumental) – 2:30
B4. "The Ghetto" (explicit a cappella) – 1:37

UK CD single
 "Sunshine" (clean album version) – 3:45
 "Baby Boy, Baby Girl" (Sunshine remix—explicit album version) – 3:41
 "Game Over" (flip—clean remix) – 4:25
 "Sunshine" (video) – 4:00

European CD single
 "Sunshine" (featuring Lea) – 3:45
 "Sunshine" (Kingpin remix featuring Lea—dirty) – 3:56

Charts

Weekly charts

Year-end charts

Certifications

Release history

References

2004 singles
2004 songs
Columbia Records singles
Lil' Flip songs
Sony Music singles
Songs written by Lil' Flip